Bosniaks in Albania are an ethnic minority living within the Republic of Albania.

Demographics
The Bosniak community of the Shijak area whose presence dates back to 1875 inhabits almost entirely the village of Borakaj and in the neighbouring village Koxhas they live alongside Albanians and form a minority. Bosniaks from these settlements have also settled in Durrës, Shijak and in 1924 some went and settled in the village of Libofshë where they have mostly become linguistically integrated.

History
With the emergence of the Great Eastern Crisis, in particular the events of the Herzegovina Uprising in 1875 Bosniaks from the Herzegovina Mostar area migrated and resettled in Northern Albania in the Shijak area. On October 13, 2017, Albania passed a Law on National Minorities that recognised nine minorities, including the Bosniak one. Despite the great isolation, the Bosniaks in Albania have preserved their language, culture and customs to this day.

Status 
On October 13, 2017, the Albanian Parliament passed the Law on the Protection of National Minorities in the Republic of Albania. In it the Bosniaks were declared a national minority. According to the law, Bosniaks have the right to learn their own language (Bosnian) as part of the regular curriculum. In addition, Bosniaks in Albania now have the right to indicate their ethnicity in censuses.

Further reading

See also
Bosniaks
Demographics of Albania
Bulgarians in Albania
Macedonians in Albania
Serbo-Montenegrins in Albania

References

Ethnic groups in Albania
Muslim communities in Europe
Bosniak diaspora